Yogobara (acronym in Korean for 요즘 고딩들의 바깥 라이프; lit. Social Life of High Schoolers Nowadays) was a South Korean television program which aired on SBS MTV every Sunday at 10:30 (KST). It was also simulcasted through Naver V Live. The show began on July 29, 2018. The show aired for 10 episodes for its first season.

Yogobara is hosted by Umji and Yoon Sanha. It is a program that empathises with teenagers, especially those in the range of 13 and 18 years old, by listening to their concerns and worries, and providing tips to ease difficulties they face in their social life.

Format
Teenagers are recommended to share their concerns through social media (10jam app and Yogobara official twitter account). The hosts would then read some of these concerns that were shared during the episodes and personally take turns to share tips (Umji's Tips and Sanha's Tips) for them. Some of the tips include beauty tips, exercise tips, diet tips and life hacks.

Each episode would focus on different keywords or topics that is related to teenagers. The concerns read and the tips provided for each episode will be matched to the keyword of that episode. For the first 4 episodes, at the end of the episode, one or two music videos of Kpop songs that are related to the keyword would be played as an ending to the show.

During the filming of the last episode (Episode 10), they did a live broadcast entitled Yogobara Live Talk on Naver V Live app where the hosts had an interactive session with the viewers and also played some games. An edited version of the live broadcast was included in the last episode of the show.

Episodes
In each episode, the program will focus on a keyword or a topic.

References

External links

 on Naver V Live

South Korean variety television shows
Korean-language television shows
2018 South Korean television series debuts